Gyeryongsan National Park is one of 20 national parks in South Korea. It was designated as a national park in 1968, as the second park in the country. One part of Gyeryongsan, a  mountain, is located in the park.

The park is home to a total of 1,121 plant species, 1,867 insect species and 645 animal species. Among the animals eleven are endangered, including Otter, Marten, Common buzzard, and Black woodpecker.

References

External links

The park's page on Korea National Park Service's website

National parks of South Korea
Protected areas established in 1968
Parks in South Chungcheong Province
Gongju
Geography of Daejeon
Tourist attractions in Daejeon